John Block is an American politician serving as a member of the New Mexico House of Representatives for the 51st district. Elected in November 2022, he assumed office on January 17, 2023.

Early life and education 
Block was born and raised in New Mexico. He earned an associate of applied science in film production and documentary media from Santa Fe Community College in 2016, a Bachelor of Arts degree in business administration from Rutgers University Camden in 2019, and a Master of Business Administration from Eastern New Mexico University in 2020.

Career 
In 2016, Block served as a staffer for members of the New Mexico House of Representatives. He also worked as a campaign aide for Yvonne Chicoine, a candidate for district attorney. In 2017, he was a legislative intern in the United States Senate.  From 2017 to 2018, he worked as a international government affairs assistant at Chevron. In 2018, Block was an associate at Ajilon, a staffing agency and subsidiary of the Adecco Group.

From 2018 to 2019, he worked as the manager of digital communications at Americans United for Life, a law firm and anti-abortion advocacy organization. From 2019 to 2020, Block worked as a client manager and PAC manager for the Committee to Defend the President, a super PAC established to support the Donald Trump 2020 presidential campaign. From 2020 to 2022, he worked as a brand manager for Pop Acta, a targeted media company. Block is the founder and editor of the Piñon Post, a conservative news outlet based in New Mexico. He was elected to the New Mexico House of Representatives in November 2022.

He is currently the youngest legislator in New Mexico and the first member of Generation Z elected to the New Mexico House of Representatives.

Electoral history

Republican primary for New Mexico House of Representatives District 51

General election for New Mexico House of Representatives District 51

Political positions

Energy 
Block is in favor of expanding oil, gas, and coal production by striking legislation such as 2019’s Energy Transition Act.

Abortion and assisted suicide 
Block believes in “the right to life“ from conception to natural death.

Second Amendment 
Block supports Constitutional Carry (Permitless Carry) legislation and opposes legislation that “would restrict New Mexicans’ rights to own and carry a firearm.”

Education 
Block believes in dismantling the New Mexico Public Education Department and instead empowering decision-making in the individual school districts.

Personal life
Block is openly gay. He lives in Alamogordo, NM with his boyfriend, Alamogordo City Commissioner Karl Melton. Block is a Christian. He is of Hispanic and Native American descent.

January 6 United States Capitol Attack 
John Block attended the January 6 United States Capitol Attack in 2021. However, he maintains that he did not enter any restricted areas. When reached for comment, the FBI informed media outlets that they could neither confirm nor deny that Block was being investigated.

References 

Living people
New Mexico Republicans
Members of the New Mexico House of Representatives
Eastern New Mexico University alumni
People from Alamogordo, New Mexico
People from Otero County, New Mexico
Year of birth missing (living people)
Rutgers University–Camden alumni